Musian (also Romanized as Mūsīān, Mūseyān, and Mūsīyān; also known as Mīsīan and Tepe Mīslan) is a city in and capital of Musian District, Dehloran County, Ilam Province, Iran. At the 2006 census, its population was 2,571, in 491 families.

Musian is largely populated by Lurs with a significant Arab minority.

References

Populated places in Dehloran County
Cities in Ilam Province
Arab settlements in llam Province
Luri settlements in Ilam Province